is a junction on the Shuto Expressway in Chūō, Tokyo.

Overview
Hakozaki Junction is a junction where the Mukojima Route branches off the Fukagawa Route, and the Edobashi Junction where the Mukojima Route branches off from the city center loop line and the Ryogoku Junction where the Mukojima Route branches off the Komatsugawa Route. Located between the two, the Mukojima Route, Komatsugawa Route, and Fukagawa Route are one of the most important points in the metropolitan expressways where the flow of three-radiation vehicles is concentrated, and it is also known as a famous place for traffic congestion. The branch sign from Route 9 to Route 6 going up is marked with "C1", which indicates the city center loop line, because Edobashi Junction is near.

The Fukagawa Route is branched from both directions of the Mukaishima Route with a two-lane ramp, but the down line is the four lanes of Edobashi Junction → Hakozaki Junction (the two lanes on the left are from the inner loop of the city center loop line, and the two lanes on the right are. The leftmost and rightmost lanes (branching from the outer loop of the city center loop line) branch to the Fukagawa Route. Previously, there was no branch from the left side to the Fukagawa Route, the left two lanes were for the Mukojima Route, and the right one lane was for the Fukagawa Route. They were needed to change lanes for up to two lanes. In order to eliminate the congestion caused by this woven traffic, the Hakozaki Junction Improvement Project was carried out between 1994 and 1998, and a branch road from the left was additionally installed.

The lower part of the junction is a clockwise one-way Hakozaki Rotary, with Hakozaki Parking Area on the easternmost rotary, the Hakozaki entrance from the west end, and the Hamamachi entrance and Kiyosubashi exit from the east end branching and merging, via the rotary. It has a special structure that connects to both the Mukojima Route and the Fukagawa Route. The Hakozaki Rotary is set up to "consolidate entrances and PAs and connect to the main line", so those who drive on the main lines of the Mukojima Route and Fukagawa Route, they do not need to enter the Hakozaki Rotary.

From the appearance when looking up at the junction from the bottom, it is sometimes called like the legendary creature "Yamata no Orochi".

References 

Shuto Expressway
Roads in Tokyo
Road junctions in Japan
Chūō, Tokyo